Fadil Sido (born 13 April 1993) is a Burkinabé football midfielder.

He played in the 2009 FIFA U-17 World Cup.

References

External links

Living people
1993 births
Burkinabé footballers
Sportspeople from Ouagadougou
Association football midfielders
Ligue 1 players
Ligue 2 players
Le Mans FC players
FC Metz players
Burkina Faso youth international footballers
21st-century Burkinabé people